The Journal of Musculoskeletal Pain is a quarterly peer-reviewed medical journal covering research on chronic muscle and bone pain, including fibromyalgia, myofascial pain, and other types of musculoskeletal pain. It is published by Informa Healthcare. The editor-in-chief is I. Jon Russell (The University of Texas Health Science Centre). The journal was established in 1993 and has a 2010 impact factor of 0.406.

External links 
 

English-language journals
Anesthesiology and palliative medicine journals
Quarterly journals
Taylor & Francis academic journals
Publications established in 1993